Best Costume Design is the name of an award which is presented by various film, television and theatre organizations, festivals, and people's awards. It may refer to:
AACTA Award for Best Costume Design
Academy Award for Best Costume Design
Africa Movie Academy Award for Best Costume Design
ARY Film Award for Best Costume Design
Asian Film Award for Best Costume Design
 BAFTA Award for Best Costume Design
Bangladesh National Film Award for Best Costume Design
Bollywood Movie Award – Best Costume Designer
British Academy Television Craft Award for Best Costume Design
British Independent Film Award for Best Costume Design
Canadian Screen Award for Best Costume Design
César Award for Best Costume Design
Costume Designers Guild Awards
Costume Designers Guild Award for Best Costume Design – Contemporary TV Series
Costume Designers Guild Award for Best Costume Design – Period or Fantasy TV Series
Critics' Choice Movie Award for Best Costume Design 
Czech Lion Award for Best Costume Design
European Film Award for Best Costume Designer
Filmfare Award for Best Costume Design
Gaumee Film Award for Best Costume Design
Genie Award for Best Achievement in Costume Design
Guldbagge Award for Best Costume Design
Golden Arena for Best Costume Design
Goya Award for Best Costume Design
IIFA Award for Best Costume Design
Laurence Olivier Award for Best Costume Design 
Magritte Award for Best Costume Design
Nandi Award for Best Costume Designer
National Film Award for Best Costume Design
Online Film Critics Society Award for Best Costume Design
Polish Academy Award for Best Costume Design
Prix Iris for Best Costume Design
Producers Guild Film Award for Best Costume Design
Robert Award for Best Costume Design
Satellite Award for Best Costume Design
Saturn Award for Best Costume Design
Screen Award for Best Costume Design
Tony Award for Best Costume Design
Tony Award for Best Costume Design in a Musical
Tony Award for Best Costume Design in a Play 
Vijay Award for Best Costume Designer 
Zee Cine Award for Best Costume Design

See also 

 Bollywood Movie Award – Best Costume Designer
 Hong Kong Film Award for Best Costume Make Up Design
 Kerala State Film Award for Best Costume Designer
 Tamil Nadu State Film Award for Best Costume Designer